Paige Alms (born April 6, 1988 in Victoria, British Columbia, Canada) is a female Hawaiian big wave surfer. In 2016, she became the first female Big Wave champion. In 2023, she was one of the first women to compete in “The Eddie”.

References

External links
Pro Surfer: Paige Alms - World Surf League

1988 births
Living people
Canadian expatriate sportspeople in the United States
Sportspeople from Victoria, British Columbia
Canadian female surfers